Slip Lake is a 22-acre lake in Cook County, Minnesota which is tributary to the Poplar River. Slip Lake reaches a maximum depth of 18 feet in a depression just south of the mouth of the stream leading to Fleck Lake. Slip Lake is accessible through portages to Dogtrot Lake and Fleck Lake. A fisheries survey turned up populations of walleye, northern pike, yellow perch, and white suckers.

References

Lakes of Cook County, Minnesota
Lakes of Minnesota
Superior National Forest